Selce is a village in Municipality of Prilep.

Demographics
According to the 2002 census, the village had a total of 294 inhabitants. Ethnic groups in the village include:

Macedonians 294

References

Villages in Prilep Municipality